Llorenç Rifé Climent (5 February 1938 – 9 January 2021) was a Spanish professional footballer who played as a defender.

Career
Born in Sant Celoni,  Rifé spent his early career at Poble Nou and Júpiter, later playing for CD Condal, Barcelona, Atlético Ceuta, Deportivo La Coruña and Gimnàstic de Tarragona. His time at Ceuta was undertaken at the same time as his military service on nearby Melilla.

Personal life
His brother Joaquim was also a footballer, as was their father and another brother, Josep Maria.

References

1938 births
2021 deaths
Spanish footballers
CE Júpiter players
CD Condal players
FC Barcelona players
AD Ceuta FC players
Deportivo de La Coruña players
Gimnàstic de Tarragona footballers
Segunda División players
La Liga players
Association football defenders